Yovhannēs Tlkuranci (Armenian: Հովհաննես Թլկուրանցի, also Anglicised as Hovhannes Tlkurantsi, ca. 1450-1535) was an Armenian poet who noted for his religious and lyric poetry.

Editions and translations 
 James R. Russell, Yovhannēs Tʻlkurancʻi and the mediaeval Armenian lyric tradition, Armenian Texts and Studies (Atlanta: Scholars Press, 1987), .
 M. E. Stone, 'Selection from On the Creation of the World by Yovhannēs Tʻlkurancʻi: Translation and Commentary', in Michael Stone, Apocrypha, Pseudepigrapha and Armenian Studies, Orientalia Lovaniensia Analecta, 144 (Leuven: Peeters, 2006), I 147-93  (extending and superseding M. E. Stone, “Selections from On the Creation of the World by Yovhannēs T‘lkuranc‘i,” in Literature on Adam and Eve: Collected Essays, ed. by Gary A. Anderson, Michael E. Stone, and Johannes Tromp, SVTP, 15 (Leiden: Brill, 2000), pp. 167–213).

References

Literature 
 James R. Russell. Yovhannēs Tʻlkurantcʻi and the Mediaeval Armenian Lyric Tradition // Armenian Texts and Studies. — Scholars Press, 1987. — Vol. 7.

External links
 Record in CERL

1535 deaths
Armenian male poets
Year of birth uncertain